Beacon Hill is one of the highest viewpoints in the hinterland of Poole Harbour, Dorset. Historically it was one of a series of beacons used to warn of the advancing Spanish Armada. The earlier name for the hill was Lytchett Beacon.

Geography 
The hill is the highest point of Lytchett Heath which is part of the Dorset Heaths within the Poole Basin. To the northeast are old clay pits, now a landfill site operated by SITA UK. Beyond it, the land rises again to the summit of Upton Heath, about 1 km away, where there is a trig point and nearby public car park. To the north-northwest, beyond the farmland, is the low, forested ridge of Stoney Down lying between the villages of Lytchett Matravers and Corfe Mullen

History 
The hill has had a key role in the defence of Dorset since at least the 14th century. It was formerly known as Lechiot Beacon and Lychett Beacon after the village of Lytchett Minster to the southwest. As the name suggests, it was the site of a beacon that would be lit in case of attack. In 1588, the beacon was lit to give warning of the approach of the Spanish Armada. During the Napoleonic Wars the beacon on Lytchett Heath was again manned in case of an attack by the French.

There were three old thatched cottages with cob walls on Lytchett Beacon which have survived to the present day and a track leads from them to the site of the old beacon. Today the track is a public footpath.

The old clay pits northeast of Beacon Hill were used to extract white china clay for export. They are now being used as a landfill site. The Dorset County Museum has exhibits from these pits.

Present day 
On the hill itself is Beacon Hill Farm as well as a caravan and camping site, the Beacon Hill Touring Park. The Dorset Wildlife Trust Urban Wildlife Centre is in Beacon Hill Lane on the northern side of the hill.

References

Literature 
 Judd, Stanley and Kim Parker, An Account of the Role of Lytchett Beacon in Dorset’s Defences.

Hills of Dorset